Ulster and Delaware Railroad Depot and Mill Complex is a historic railroad depot and national historic district located at Roxbury in Delaware County, New York. The district contains five contributing buildings and one contributing structure.  It was developed between about 1876 and 1946 and includes the Ulster and Delaware Railroad Depot, Robinson and Preston Steam Flour and Feed Mill, Slawson-Decker-Sheffield Co Creamery, Ulster and Delaware Railroad Ice House, and George M. Orr Blacksmith Shop.

It was listed on the National Register of Historic Places in 2003.

The Ulster & Delaware Railroad Historical Society operates the Roxbury Depot Museum in the railroad station.

See also
National Register of Historic Places listings in Delaware County, New York

References

External links
Roxbury Depot Museum and Ulster & Delaware Railroad Historical Society - brochure from the Ulster & Delaware Railroad Historical Society
Roxbury Depot Museum information from I Love NY
Roxbury Depot Museum | The official guide to New York State’s tourist railroads and museums
Ulster & Delaware Railroad Historical Society - museum hours are listed under Calendar of Events

National Register of Historic Places in Delaware County, New York
Historic districts on the National Register of Historic Places in New York (state)
Historic districts in Delaware County, New York